Josh Howard is the writer/artist of the American comic book series Dead@17 published by Image Comics (formerly published by Viper Comics), Black Harvest published by Devil's Due, and the Lost Books of Eve published by Viper Comics. Howard is also a regular columnist for the Wizard website.

External links

Interviews
 Comic Foundry
 IGN Josh Howard's Creative Harvest
 The Comics Review
 Josh Howard talks
 Dead@17 marches on
 QRD

American comics writers
American comics artists
Year of birth missing (living people)
Living people